This is a list of Australian television events and premieres which occurred in 2011. This year will be the 56th year of continuous operation of television in Australia.

Events 
 11 January – Ten Network Holdings and CBS Studios International launch digital multi-channel Eleven, which replaces the standard definition simulcast of One HD. Network Ten also permanently shifts its long-running soap opera Neighbours to the new channel after having aired the series for 24 years. The first episode on Eleven was its highest-rated program of the night, recording 254,000 metropolitan viewers.
 13 January – The Australian Government lifts restrictions on the anti-siphoning rule to allow the Seven Network to air parts of the Australian Open on its digital multichannel 7Two while Seven News airs on the primary channel. This practice has continued in subsequent years.
 16 January – Prime Television and GWN Television rebrand as Prime7 and GWN7 respectively, reaffirming their alignment with the Seven Network. The "Prime" on-screen watermark is also removed for Seven Network digital multichannels 7Two and 7mate.
 24 January – The launch of 6PM with George Negus and Ten Evening News marks Network Ten's return to the regular broadcasting of news and current affairs programs in the 6:00–7:00 pm timeslot for the first time in 20 years. The new line-up is in direct competition with news and current affairs offerings on both the Seven and Nine networks.
 4 April – Seven picks up the rights to televise Wimbledon, and in doing so, promises viewers live coverage of most matches including the men's and women's singles semi-finals, and championship matches.
 27 April – Two days before it was due to air, ABC Television is forced to cancel their planned coverage of the Wedding of Prince William of Wales and Kate Middleton, which was to be a "satirical commentary" by The Chaser, due to restrictions imposed by Clarence House. Set to air on ABC2, The Chaser’s Royal Wedding Commentary, was instead replaced by a simulcast of BBC's coverage and commentary of the wedding.
 28 April – The Australian Football League (AFL) television broadcast rights for the 2012 to 2016 seasons is awarded to the Seven Network and Foxtel in a record $1.253 billion deal (including mobile and internet coverage awarded to Telstra). The Seven Network will broadcast four games each round, three of them live, as well as all finals live. For the first time, Foxtel will broadcast all nine matches each round, as well as all finals except the Grand Final, live, simulcasting the Seven Network's coverage of its four games. Foxtel will also relaunch a dedicated AFL channel after its previous attempt, the Fox Footy Channel, ceased broadcasting in 2006.
 2 May – Emma Duncan wins the sixth season of The Biggest Loser.
 8 May – Network Ten shifts the focus of its high-definition digital multichannel One from purely sports coverage and programming, to a mix of general entertainment and sports, specifically targeting audiences in the male 24-to-54-year-old demographic.
 26 June – Heather Foord presents her final Nine News Queensland bulletin before retiring from television permanently; she is replaced the following weekend by Eva Milic.
 10 July – TV chef Manu Feildel, alongside professional dance partner Alana Patience, win the eleventh season of Dancing with the Stars.
 28 July – 7TWO, 7mate, GEM, GO!, ONE & ELEVEN expand to Western Australia.
 1 August – Surfers and best friends Tyler Atkins and Nathan Jolliffe win the first season of The Amazing Race Australia.
 2 August – Jack Vidgen wins the fifth season of Australia's Got Talent.
 7 August – Kate Bracks wins the third season of MasterChef Australia.
 20 and 21 August – The Nine Network's most-watched Queensland news bulletin conducts two crosses to journalists in a helicopter claiming to be "near Beerwah, Queensland", where the remains of murdered schoolboy Daniel Morcombe had been found earlier that month. However, the crosses are revealed to be fake when, on the second night, rival station Channel Seven filmed footage of the Nine helicopter sitting on the helipad outside their studios at Mount Coot-tha at the time of the broadcast. Radar footage also revealed that, on the first night, the helicopter was actually hovering over Chapel Hill, 70 km away from Beerwah. Two journalists, Melissa Mallet and Cameron Price, as well as news producer Aaron Wakeley, are all sacked by the Nine Network following the incident, while Lee Anderson resigned in protest over the sackings.
 21 August – Polly Porter and Warwick "Waz" Jones win the fourth season of The Block.
 7 September – Robert Davidov wins the first series of Top Design Australia.
 9 September – Nine Network confirmed that they were bringing back Big Brother Australia in 2012.
 9 September – The eleventh season of the popular British children's television series Thomas & Friends finally airs on ABC2 at 1:05pm starting with Hide and Peep.
 12 September – Dylan Cooper wins the third season of Project Runway Australia.
 30 September – Ten Late News and Sports Tonight withdrawn their Broadcasts for the very last time.
 12 October – Michael Lynch wins the first series of The Renovators.
 22 October – Nine News Sydney overtakes Seven News Sydney as the news ratings leader in Sydney for the first time since 2004.
 25 October Montana Cox wins the seventh season of Australia's Next Top Model.
 11 November – 7TWO, 7mate, GEM, GO!, ONE & ELEVEN expand to South Eastern South Australia.
 21 November – Comedian Julia Morris wins the first season of The Celebrity Apprentice Australia.
 22 November – Reece Mastin wins the third series of The X Factor.
 23 November – Greta Yaxley wins the second season of Junior MasterChef Australia.
 24 November – Sarah Lawther and Lachlan Cosgrove win the third season of Beauty and the Geek Australia.
 27 November – The Seven Network wins its 40th (out of a possible 40) week of ratings for the 2011 calendar year, and becomes the first Australian television network to achieve a clean sweep of a ratings calendar year.

Celebrity Deaths
 4 January – Geoff Raymond (aged 89), news presenter.
 21 May – Bill Hunter (aged 71), actor
11 June, James Elliot (aged 82) Scottish-born Australian actor, best known as Alf Sutcliffe Number 96

Channels
 New channels
 11 January – Eleven
 29 May – Disney Junior
 28 July - 7TWO, GO!, GEM, ONE, ELEVEN & 7mate (Albany/Bunbury)
 11 November - February 2012 - 7TWO, GO!, GEM, ONE, ELEVEN & 7mate (Mount Gambier/Riverland)

 Renamed channels
 16 January – Prime7 (replacing Prime)
 16 January – GWN7 (replacing GWN)
 1 May – ABC4 Kids (replacing ABC For Kids on 2, but shared with ABC2)
 8 May – One (replacing One HD)

Premieres

Domestic series

International series

Telemovies

Miniseries
 Domestic

 International

Documentaries
 Domestic

 International

Programming changes

Changes to network affiliation
This is a list of programs which made their premiere on an Australian television network that had previously premiered on another Australian television network. The networks involved in the switch of allegiances are predominantly both free-to-air networks or both subscription television networks. Programs that have their free-to-air/subscription television premiere, after previously premiering on the opposite platform (free-to air to subscription/subscription to free-to air) are not included. In some cases, programs may still air on the original television network. This occurs predominantly with programs shared between subscription television networks.

Domestic

International

Free-to-air premieres
This is a list of programs which made their premiere on Australian free-to-air television that had previously premiered on Australian subscription television. Programs may still air on the original subscription television network.

Subscription premieres
This is a list of programs which made their premiere on Australian subscription television that had previously premiered on Australian free-to-air television. Programs may still air on the original free-to-air television network.

Ended this year

Returning this year

See also 
 2011 in Australia
 List of Australian films of 2011

Notes

References